Saanigudem is a village in Eluru district of the Indian state of Andhra Pradesh. It is administered under the Eluru revenue division.

Demographics 

 Census of India, Saanigudem has population of 1025 of which 555 are males while 470 are females. Average Sex Ratio is 847. Population of children with age 0-6 is 87  which makes up 8.49% of total population of village, Child sex ratio is 1071. Literacy rate of the village was 63.65%.

References

Villages in Eluru district